Papuascincus stanleyanus is a species of skink, a lizard in the family Scincidae. The species is endemic to New Guinea.

Etymology
The specific name, stanleyanus, refers to the Owen Stanley Range.

Foreign language common names
P. stanleyanus is known as kls or mabdagol in the Kalam language of Papua New Guinea.

Habitat
Papuascincus stanleyanus is commensal with humans, and is often found in human settlements. In the Upper Kaironk Valley of Madang Province, Papua New Guinea, it is the most common small lizard found in houses.

Reproduction
C. stanleyanus is oviparous.

References

Further reading
Allison A, Greer AE (1986). "Egg Shells with Pustulate Surface Structures: Basis for a New Genus of New Guinea Skinks (Lacertilia: Scincidae)". Journal of Herpetology 20 (1): 116–119. (Papuascincus stanleyanus, new combination).
Smith MA (1937). "A Review of the Genus Lygosoma (Scincidae: Reptilia) and its Allies". Records of the Indian Museum 39 (3): 213–234. {Lygosoma (Leiolopisma) stanleyana, p. 225}.

Papuascincus
Reptiles described in 1897
Skinks of New Guinea
Endemic fauna of New Guinea
Taxa named by George Albert Boulenger